Lessingianthus elegans is a species of flowering plants in the family Asteraceae. It is found in Bolivia.

References

External links 
Lessingianthus elegans at Tropicos

Vernonieae
Plants described in 1988
Flora of Bolivia